Daniel Mikic (born 6 July 1992) is a German professional footballer who plays as a defender for  club SC Verl.

References

External links
 
 

1992 births
Living people
German footballers
Association football defenders
Arminia Bielefeld II players
SC Verl players
Oberliga (football) players
Regionalliga players
3. Liga players